The LKG Tower is an office skyscraper located in Makati, Philippines, and is one of the tallest in the city. Standing at 180.1 metres (590.88 feet), the building has 38 floors above ground, and 5 basement levels for parking.

The LKG Tower is owned by International Copra Export Corporation (ICEC) Land Corporation, and was designed by architectural firm Kohn Pedersen Fox Associates, in cooperation with local firm Recio + Casas Architects. It has a distinctive shape in its upper part, and this was emphasized by the presence of its "ribbon" design that cuts diagonally through its facade.

References 

Skyscrapers in Makati
Skyscraper office buildings in Metro Manila
Kohn Pedersen Fox buildings
Office buildings completed in 2000